Kenneth Kramer could refer to:

Ken Kramer (Kenneth Bentley Kramer, born 1942), American politician
Kenny Kramer (born 1943), American stand-up comedian and the inspiration for the fictional character Cosmo Kramer on the American television show Seinfeld

See also
Kenneth F. Cramer (1894-1954), American politician and U.S. Army general